WRRX (106.1 FM) is an urban adult contemporary music formatted radio station in the Pensacola, Florida, market owned by Cumulus Media.  Its studios and transmitter are separately located in Pensacola.

WRRX signed on in 2000 as WZRO with an active rock format as "Rock 106, Pensacola's Real Rock." Shortly thereafter, WZRO changed calls to WRRX. In 2004, WRRX changed format to Urban AC. It is one of two Urban ACs that Cumulus owns in the Gulf Coast area, the other being WDLT-FM in Mobile, Alabama.

External links
WRRX official website

RRX
Urban adult contemporary radio stations in the United States
Cumulus Media radio stations
2000 establishments in Florida
Radio stations established in 2000